People who served as the mayor of the Municipality of Ashfield are:

References

Mayors Ashfield
Ashfield, Mayors
Mayors of Ashfield